BHP, bhp or similar may refer to:

Companies and organizations
BHP, Australian multinational mining, metals and petroleum dual-listed public company; currently the largest mining company in the world. Previous and/or related names for BHP include:
1885-2000 The Broken Hill Proprietary Company Limited
2000-2001 BHP Limited
2001-2017 BHP Billiton Limited and BHP Billiton plc
BHP Nevada Railroad, a defunct Nevada railroad owned by the company
Bandim Health Project, a health research facility in Guinea-Bissau in West Africa
Beardmore Halford Pullinger, a make of aero engines 
Botswana-Harvard AIDS Institute Partnership
Broadlands Hydropower Project, a hydroelectric power project in Kitulgala, Sri Lanka
Texas Business Honors Program (BHP), an undergraduate program in the McCombs School of Business at the University of Texas at Austin

Measurements
Units that approximate the mechanical power output expected of a typical draft horse:
 Brake horsepower (or braking horsepower), time-rate of energy extraction in deceleration
 Boiler horsepower, output power of a mechanical-power-producing machine that delivers energy via vapor (typically steam)

Other uses
Bhojpur Airport (IATA airport code)
Browning Hi-Power, a  pistol
Butylated hydroxytoluene